FreightCenter is a privately owned, non-asset based 3rd-party logistics provider (3PL) with headquarters in Palm Harbor, FL. FreightCenter acts as a conduit between freight carriers and commercial or residential shippers located in the United States and Canada. As a conduit, shippers use the provider's online freight quote calculator to calculate freight costs for less than truckload, truckload, rail, ocean and air freight.

History 
James and Matthew J. Brosious founded American Freight Companies, the parent company to FreightCenter., in September 1998. The company operates under MC 444954-B and offers $100,000 surety bond protection under Moving Ahead for Progress in the 21st Century Act legislation.

In 2010, FreightCenter and Go Daddy.com, LLC partnered on an integration of the provider's API Web services and Go Daddy's Quick Shopping Cart application. Users use the API to consume freight rates, quotes and booking data. The FreightCenter API is compatible with any business software, OMS, WMS, CMS, TMS, and eCommerce shopping carts, such as Magento and WooCommerce.

Services 
FreightCenter is used to search online for common carrier or trucking company rates, equipment and transit options.

List of services
 Online freight quotes
 EDI/API and manual carrier dispatch
 Provide shipping documents (bill of lading, shipping labels, etc.)
 Shipment tracking
 Route optimization
 Freight Audit & Spend Analysis
 Transportation Management System software
 API Web development

References

Logistics companies of the United States
Transport companies established in 1998
Transportation companies based in Florida
American companies established in 1998
1998 establishments in Florida